Keystone State Park is a  Pennsylvania state park in Derry Township, Westmoreland County, Pennsylvania in the United States. Located off U.S. Route 22 near New Alexandria, the park opened in 1945. Its main attraction is the man-made  Keystone Lake.  The park also has extensive picnic areas and several miles of hiking trails.

History 
Keystone Coal and Coke Company constructed Keystone Lake in the early 1900s for use in washing coal extracted from a nearby coal mine known as Salem #1 and quenching its coke ovens. A second mine, Salem #2, was in operation by the 1910s. Both mines had ceased operations by 1945. Abandoned mine tunnels lie beneath Hillside Campground and the cabin area. A mine entrance, now sealed, is located east of Pavilion #2 and north of the cabin entrance road.

Recreation 
Keystone State Park is open to camping and also has several cabins that are available to rent year round.

Keystone State Park has two campgrounds. Lakeside campground is on the shores of Keystone Lake. It has 40 campsites for tents or campers. Hillside campground is in a more remote part of the park. It has 60 campsites, also for tents or campers. Each campground has some sites with an electric hook-up, a modern bathhouse and a sanitary dump station.

The cabins at Keystone State Park are modern. The 11 cabins are located near the dam and between the campgrounds. Each cabin can sleep up to six guests in two bedrooms. The cabins are equipped with a modern bathroom, a kitchen with a stove, microwave and refrigerator. The yard areas have picnic tables, grills and fire rings.

Hunting is permitted on about half of Keystone State Park. The most common game species are eastern cottontail rabbits, common pheasant, eastern gray squirrels, wild turkey, ruffed grouse and white-tailed deer.  The hunting of groundhogs is prohibited. Hunters are expected to follow the rules and regulations of the Pennsylvania Game Commission.

Lake 

Keystone Lake provides a habitat for both warm and cold water species of fish. The common game fish in Keystone Lake are carp, northern pike, tiger muskellunge, largemouth bass, black crappie, yellow perch and bullhead catfish. The Pennsylvania Fish and Boat Commission stocks  the lake with trout prior to the start of trout season in April. The lake is also open to ice fishing when the conditions permit.

Gas powered boats are prohibited on Keystone Lake. Non-powered and electric powered boats must display a current registration from any state or a launch permit from the Pennsylvania Fish and Boat Commission.

A beach on the lake is open for swimming daily from 8:00am until sunset. The swimming season begins on Memorial Day weekend and ends Labor Day weekend. Lifeguards are not provided.

See also 

Dear Zachary: A Letter to a Son About His Father is a documentary film about Andrew and Zachary Bagby. Andrew was murdered at the park by Zachary's mother, Shirley Turner, who later murdered Zachary in a murder-suicide in Newfoundland.

Nearby state parks 
The following state parks are within  of Keystone State Park:
Allegheny Islands State Park (Allegheny County)
Kooser State Park (Somerset County)
Laurel Hill State Park (Somerset County)
Laurel Mountain State Park (Westmoreland County)
Laurel Ridge State Park (Cambria, Fayette, Somerset and Westmoreland Counties)
Laurel Summit State Park (Westmoreland County)
Linn Run State Park (Westmoreland County)
Yellow Creek State Park (Indiana County)

References

External links 

  

State parks of Pennsylvania
Parks in Westmoreland County, Pennsylvania
Parks in the Pittsburgh metropolitan area
Laurel Highlands
Protected areas established in 1945
Protected areas of Westmoreland County, Pennsylvania